The women's 400 metres hurdles event at the 2011 All-Africa Games was held on 14–15 September.

Medalists

Results

Heats
Qualification: First 3 of each heat (Q) and the next 2 fastest (q) qualified for the final.

Final

References
Results
Results

400
2011 in women's athletics